Elizabeth Burton  is the name of:

Liz Burton, character in Hollyoaks
Elizabeth Taylor, actress (1932–2011), married name Burton
Lizzie Burton, character in EastEnders
Alice Elizabeth Burton (born 1908), novelist and popular historian
Elizabeth Eaton Burton (1869–1937), American artist and designer

See also
Burton (name)